Green Carnation is a Norwegian progressive metal band from Kristiansand, formed in 1990. Green Carnation's trend of music has continuously changed on every release one by one; from straight forward death metal in their demo, to death-doom, then a progressive doom metal sound, to an atmospheric gothic metal sound, to a melancholic hard rock sound and in 2006, went as far as to releasing an entirely acoustic album Acoustic Verses. The band released its first album in 14 years titled Leaves of Yesteryear on May 8, 2020, which marked a return to their earlier gothic progressive metal roots. A new single was composed, arranged, rehearsed and recorded during the COVID-19 pandemic, called "The World Without a View", and released digitally on December 18th 2020.

History

Formation and early years (1990–2001)
Green Carnation is the creation of former Emperor bass player Terje Vik Schei (a.k.a. Tchort), founded before Tchort joined Emperor in 1990. It eventually split, with the remaining members X-Botteri, Cm:Botteri and Anders Kobro creating avant-garde metal band In the Woods....

Green Carnation's first album, Journey to the End of the Night, was not recorded until 1998 and was released in October 2000 through German record company Prophecy Productions. The release was a folk inspired doom metal album.  The Botteri brothers, Alf Tore Rasmussen, and Geir Solli left the band after recording the debut album, and then Anders Kobro from In The Woods... joined up with Tchort. Together, they spent nearly two years making the foundational arrangements for what eventually became Light of Day, Day of Darkness, a single track, 60-minute progressive metal epic which is one of the longest single songs in metal. They then did a pre-production in the studio with Tchort on guitar, Kobro on drums, and Endre Kirkesola on bass. This was enough to convince guitarist Bjørn Harstad, also of In The Woods..., to join the band in time for the final recording of the album, accompanied by Stein Roger Sordal on bass, Kjetil Nordhus on vocals, and Bernt Moen of Shining on keyboards. Light of Day, Day of Darkness was released in 2001 via Prophecy Productions in Europe, while the US release was handled by The End Records.

Genre branching and new identity (2001–2006)
Following this release, the band released their 2003 full-length album A Blessing in Disguise through French record label Season Of Mist. The album consisted of a blend of progressive metal/rock elements, slightly gothic tinges, and hard rock elements and brought the band into another musical terrain. Bjørn Harstad left the band after the recording of A Blessing, a decision he made due to his other work commitments.  Unfortunately Bernt Moen also decided to quit the band due to obligations with other artists and solo projects after the Blessing in Disguise tour of 2003.

Two years later the band followed up with the album The Quiet Offspring, introducing Kenneth Silden on keyboard and Michael Krumins on guitar.  The album was released through Season Of Mist in Europe and The End Records in the US. This album brought the band into an even more hard-rock style of music and is seen by many to be their most commercial-sounding release.  At this point, they made the decision to replace Anders Kobro with drummer Tommy Jackson (Jacksonville). Jacksonville was a natural choice since he had been a long-time friend and partner of Stein Sordal's other projects, Soxpan, Sordal and Plutho ++).  Later in 2005, the band released an EP entitled The Burden Is Mine... Alone. This EP marked the debut of bassist/guitarist Stein Roger Sordal as a lead vocalist in the band, with the song that shares the name of the EP and the song was written and performed entirely by him. Drummer Tommy Jacksonville also debuted as songwriter and lyricist on the EP. He wrote the song "Transparent Me" for the album. This release also worked as a taste of what was to come with their following full-length album.

Early 2006 marked the release of their fifth full-length Acoustic Verses. This album was yet another stylistic shift for the band. On the album, the band played all acoustic instruments, showing off a softer, warmer style for the band while retaining the progressive and darker feels they established since their debut.

Hiatus (2007–2014)
According to Tchort's writings in the booklet to Acoustic Verses, Green Carnation's next studio release was going to be the second part of "The Chronicles of Doom" trilogy, which began with Light of Day, Day of Darkness, and is going to be titled The Rise and Fall of Mankind.

In February 2007 Green Carnation recorded their second live DVD, A Night Under the Dam, where they played the entire Acoustic Verses album as well as a few other songs. The DVD was recorded under a 30-meter-tall dam in the Norwegian mountains and was the last release to be seen by the band's current line-up.

On August 17, 2007, Tchort announced that due to the poorly organized American tour and subsequent financial and motivational losses, the line up of Green Carnation had split up. . He stated that he would "continue writing music under the name Green Carnation, but probably will never play live again with the band."
The expected album, The Rise and Fall of Mankind, has been postponed with no current release date, but Tchort has said that the album will be released sometime in the future. However, the announced album title was eventually discarded for unknown reasons after the group's long break.

Reunion (2014–present) 
On February 20, 2014, the band members announced that they would reunite for a second version of A Night Under the Dam on July 31, 2014 ). In the same press release, they further announced their availability for festivals and shows. A short documentary about the reunion show has been released on the Norwegian website Eternal-Terror.

On September 10, 2016, Green Carnation made its debut at ProgPower USA (PPUSA) at Center Stage in Atlanta, Georgia. The band played "Light of Day, Day of Darkness" in its entirety to a sold-out venue. This performance received rave reviews and many claim it to be one of the best performances ever, at PPUSA.  

On August 24, 2018, the group released their third live album Last Day of Darkness on DVD/CD format under the Prophecy Productions label. The show was recorded at the Kilden Centre, Kristiansand on November 26, 2016.

The band announced the recording of their first album in 14 years titled Leaves of Yesteryear. On March 5, 2020 was released the title track as a music video and a single for digital download. On May 6, 2020, the band did a live listening party via YouTube to introduce the world to their sixth studio album.

Finally, Leaves of Yesteryear was released on May 8, 2020 via Season of Mist and produced by Green Carnation and Endre Kirkesola. The album was recorded and mixed by Endre Kirkesola. The mastering was done by mastering engineer Maor Appelbaum.

On November 13, 2020, the band released the single "The World Without a View", only available as a streaming video and digital download via Season of Mist. The song was since released digitally on December 18th 2020.

Discography

Studio albums

Other releases

Band members

Current members
Terje Vik Schei (a.k.a. Tchort) − guitars (1990–1991, 1998–2007, 2014–present)
Stein Roger Sordal − bass, vocals, guitars, harp (2001–2006, 2014–present)
Bjørn "Berserk" Harstad – guitars, slide guitars, ebow (2001–2003, 2006, 2016, 2019–present)
Kjetil Nordhus − vocals (2001–2007, 2014–present)
Kenneth Silden − piano, keyboards (2005–2007, 2014–present)
Jonathan Pérez – drums (2016–present)

Former members
Christopher "C:M." Botteri – bass (1990–1991, 1998–2001)
Anders Kobro – drums (1990–1991, 2001–2005)
Christian "X" Botteri – guitars (1990–1991, 1998–2001)
Richart Olsen – vocals (1990–1991)
Alf T. Leangel – drums (1998–2001)
Bernt A Moen – keyboards, piano (2001–2004)
Øystein Tønnessen – keyboards, piano (2004)
Michael Krumins − guitar, theremin (2004–2007, 2014–2017)
Tommy Jacksonville − drums (2005–2007, 2014–2016)
Endre Kirkesola – keyboards (2001, 2016-2017)

Live session musicians
Ole Vistnes – bass (2005)
Anne Marie Almedal – vocals (2006)

Timeline

See also
 In The Woods...
 Tristania
 Emperor
 Trail of Tears
 Blood Red Throne
 Carpathian Forest
 Chain Collector
 Subterranean Masquerade

References

External links
Official Website

[ Green Carnation @ AllMusic.com]

Norwegian progressive metal musical groups
Norwegian gothic metal musical groups
Norwegian doom metal musical groups
Norwegian death metal musical groups
Norwegian avant-garde metal musical groups
Musical groups established in 1990
1990 establishments in Norway
Musical groups disestablished in 1991
1991 disestablishments in Norway
Musical groups reestablished in 1999
Musical groups from Kristiansand
Metal Mind Productions artists
Season of Mist artists